Escola Dom João Paulino, is one of the earliest schools built in Macao, established in 1911. Located on Taipa, it is operated by the Diocese of Macau.
It is a member of the Macau Catholic Schools Association.

History

In 1895, The former of Escola Dom João Paulino is catechistic literating classes for Macao children established by Nun Canossa

In 1911, about 70 persons were studying here. The school was built next to Our Lady of Carmel Church. After that, Priest 司徒澤雄 took over the school and named it as 聖善(meaning “Holiness" in Chinese). The native-born Portuguese people called it as Escola Dom João Paulino, which means 'the School of Bishop João Paulino'.

In 1938, the Diocese allocated a building on No. 89-91, Rua Direita Carlos Eugénio for developing a complete primary school

Environment
 Ground floor: hall, playground, teachers’ office, principal’s office
 1st floor: Kindergarten, Primary 1, music room
 2nd floor: Primary 2-5
 3rd floor: Primary 6, library, computer room

Served principal

Famous alumni
 José Lai: current Roman Catholic Bishop of the Diocese of Macao, graduated in 1958

See also
 Roman Catholic Diocese of Macau

References

Schools in Macau
Educational institutions established in 1911
1911 establishments in the Portuguese Empire